Colin Taylor (24 August 1940 — June 2005) was a Stourbridge-born English footballer who played for Walsall F.C. in three different spells, with whom he made at least 459 league appearances by the end of the 1972–73 season, scoring at least 169 goals. He also made 33 appearances in league games for Newcastle (7 goals) in season 1963-64 and 34 appearances in league games for Crystal Palace (8 goals), in season 1968–69, in which he helped Palace achieve promotion to the top flight for the first time. His haul of 32 goals for Walsall in season 1959–60 remains a record from the left wing.

Taylor was a flame-haired, barrel-chested left-winger who was a member of Walsall's first team during their golden days of the 1950s and 1960s. Taylor was best known for his powerful shooting skills and the accuracy of his left foot and as a result of this, he was nick-named "Cannonball Colin" by Walsall`s fans. Such was the power in his left boot, Walsall fans of his era would claim that "his left leg was out of proportion to his right". Supporters would also eulogise that, when he shot at the "Railway End" goal at Fellow's Park, and happened to miss, the speed of the ball would be such, as to knock the rust off an old tea-sales caravan, permanently parked at that end.

On his retirement from professional football, Taylor, a quiet, modest man, worked as a painter and decorator.

Following his death in 2005, Walsall F.C. promised to build a permanent memorial for Taylor.

Honours
with Walsall
Football League Fourth Division champion: 1959–60

References

External links

1940 births
2005 deaths
English footballers
Sportspeople from Stourbridge
Walsall F.C. players
Newcastle United F.C. players
Crystal Palace F.C. players
Association football midfielders
English Football League players
Kidderminster Harriers F.C. players